Germany Year 90 Nine Zero (French: Allemagne année 90 neuf zéro) is a French film directed by Jean-Luc Godard and starring Eddie Constantine in his signature role as detective Lemmy Caution. This is the second film in which Godard and Constantine collaborated with the Lemmy Caution character, although it is not officially a sequel to Alphaville. It was also the 15th and final time that Constantine would play his signature role in 40 years.

The film was screened in competition at the 48th Venice International Film Festival, in which it won the President of the Italian Senate's Gold Medal.

The title is a reference to the 1948 Roberto Rossellini film Germany, Year Zero.

Summary
Just after the fall of the Berlin Wall, Lemmy Caution roams around the city aimlessly. The film is part narrative and part documentary essay picture about German history and politics.

Cast
Eddie Constantine as Lemmy Caution
Hanns Zischler as Count Zelten 
Claudia Michelsen as Charlotte Kestner / Dora
Nathalie Kadem as Delphine de Stael
André S. Labarthe as Récitant 
Robert Wittmers as Don Quichotte
Kim Kashkashian as Musician
Anton Mossine as Dimitri

References

External links

French avant-garde and experimental films
Films directed by Jean-Luc Godard
1990s avant-garde and experimental films
1990s French films